Biswajit Das was a 24-year-old tailor in Dhaka, Bangladesh, who was murdered on 9 December 2012 by members of the Bangladesh Chhatra League (BCL), the student wing of the governing Awami League party. On that day there was a nationwide road blockade, called by the opposition 18 Party Alliance. That morning, Das was on his way to his shop, Amantron Tailors at Shankhari Bazaar in Old Dhaka, when one or more small bombs exploded near an anti-blockade procession of BCL activists from Jagannath University. A group of them mistook Das for an opposition supporter and chased him from near Bahadur Shah Park into a nearby building. They attacked him with machetes, iron bars, and hockey sticks. Das attempted to escape, but fell down at Shankhari Bazar Road. A rickshaw-puller took Das to Mitford Hospital, where he shortly died of his wounds.

The daytime murder was captured live on television, and appalled the nation. Within days, Jagannath University expelled three students and cancelled the certificates of two others for alleged involvement in the murder. The following week they expelled four more.

By 25 December, seven suspects were in police custody. An eighth man was arrested on 26 May 2013. The eight were among twenty-one indicted on 2 June for Das' murder. All were activists of the Jagannath University unit of the BCL. Their trial started on 14 July. All twenty-one were found guilty on 18 December 2013. Eight were sentenced to death and thirteen were sentenced to life in prison. Thirteen, including two of those sentenced to death, were convicted in absentia and, as of August 2017, have not been apprehended.

In its 2012 Country Reports on Human Rights Practices, the United States Department of State cites Das' murder as an example of political violence in connection with general strikes in Bangladesh.

References 

Murder in Bangladesh
Political scandals in Bangladesh
Deaths by blade weapons
Deaths by person in Bangladesh
December 2012 events in Bangladesh
Political violence in Bangladesh
Filmed killings in Asia
Human rights abuses in Bangladesh
2012 murders in Bangladesh
Male murder victims